Greystanes is a suburb in Greater Western Sydney, New South Wales, Australia. Greystanes is located 25 kilometres west of the Sydney central business district in the local government area of Cumberland Council. Founded in the late 1790s, Greystanes is one of the oldest suburbs in Sydney.

History
 
In the early years of British settlement the area was known as Prospect Hill and was the site of the first land grants to emancipated convicts in 1791. In this period it was one of several areas of conflict between the Darug people and the settlers, the Darug people being led for many years of guerrilla warfare by Pemulwuy.

The area later became differentiated into Prospect, to the west of Greystanes Creek, and Greystanes to the east of the Creek, the latter taking its name from a historical home on Prospect Hill, built by Nelson Simmons Lawson, third child of Lieutenant William Lawson. The name 'Grey Stanes', given by Nelson Lawson, came from the outcrops of basalt on Prospect Hill, "Grey" being its colour and "Stanes" being the Scottish word for stones. The land was originally granted to William Cummings in 1799, before being acquired by William Lawson in approximately 1810.

The area was used for poultry farming in the early twentieth century until Greystanes developed in the 1950s and 1960s as a residential suburb. Frank Cefai, a Maltese migrant, is a well known developer who built thousands of residential homes throughout Greystanes and its surrounding suburbs. Frank built and helped fund the Our Lady Queen of Peace Catholic Church in 1975 and the surrounding primary and secondary schools.

Heritage listings 
Greystanes has a number of heritage-listed sites, including:
 Lower Prospect Canal Reserve

Culture
Many of the early residents of Greystanes were from Malta and many of them operated poultry farms. Three family poultry businesses from Greystanes became household names throughout Australia - Cordina Chickens, Baiada Chickens and Pace Farm Eggs. Greystanes still has a large Maltese Australian community. The Maltese community have hosted a Festa (Festa tal-Vitorja & Maria Bambina) every October since 1965 in and around the church.

The Maltese community purchased the land and built a new church dedicated to Our Lady of Victories in 1975. The Maltese Festa has its origins in the religious festivals held annually in each village of Malta, celebrating the patron saint of the village. The church and parish were named after Our Lady of Victories, a beautifully hand crafted statue from Italy, a replica of Maria Bambina from Gozo. Despite hundreds of years of tradition, the clergy of the Catholic Church deemed it incorrect to have the moniker Victories attached to Our Lady. The church then became the Parish of Our Lady Queen of Peace. The statue is on display in the church and at the annual procession of the Maltese Festa.

Religion

Greystanes has a small number of Christian churches of many denominations:
 Our Lady Queen of Peace Catholic Church 
 Greystanes Uniting Church
 Holroyd New Life Church

Transport

Greystanes is primarily accessible by road. At the Greystanes M4 Junction several major roads meet including: the Cumberland Highway, the Great Western Highway and the M4 Western Motorway. The fastest route from the Sydney CBD is via the M4 Western Motorway, exiting at the Cumberland Highway.

Greystanes is serviced by Region 3 Transit Systems Sydney bus services with routes linking to Parramatta railway station and Blacktown railway station on the T1 North Shore & Western Line and Merrylands railway station and Liverpool railway station on the T2 Inner West & Leppington Line of the Sydney Trains network.

Commercial areas
Greystanes Shopping Centre (owned by SCA Property Group) is a semi-enclosed, single level neighbourhood shopping centre anchored by Woolworths along with 27 speciality shops. It opened in 1978 and was refurbished in 2014.

Education

Greystanes is serviced by a number of educational institutions including many child-care centres, Department of Education schools including Greystanes Public School, Beresford Rd Primary School, Ringrose Primary School, Widemere Public School, Greystanes High School, Holroyd High School and two Catholic Education, Diocese of Parramatta schools which include Our Lady Queen of Peace Primary School and St Pauls Catholic College (originally St. Simon Stock High School and later Newman High School).

Holroyd High School houses an Intensive English Centre which provides a specialised program to non-English speaking migrants and refugees so that they can better participate in Australian society.

Parks and recreation

Greystanes contains a large number of parks, ovals, and sporting facilities, as well as a golf course. The south side of Greystanes features the Lower Prospect Canal Reserve what is simply known by residents as the Canal. Small neighbourhood parks are scattered around the suburb.  One prominent park is the Canal Road Park, which is 70 metres above sea level and thus features a panoramic lookout of southwest Sydney.

Originally it was a water canal once used to transport water from the Prospect Reservoir, but has since been decommissioned and converted into a cycle and walkway. Despite this, it is still referred to by its original function. The Canal features the regionally well-known Boothtown Aqueduct (as its original function was) located on Macquarie Rd, Greystanes.

The south-west of Greystanes contains the Gipps Road Sporting Complex and the Rosford Street Reserve, which consist of multiple ovals suitable for sports such as football and cricket. Around the ovals are large, open fields, suitable for other forms of recreation and a small BMX track in Rosford Street Reserve. A small-bore rifle club is located on Hyland Road, near the aforementioned sporting complexes and the Hyland Road Youth Centre. The Cumberland Country Golf Club is located to the geographic centre of the suburb.

Population

Demographics

Of these:

 49.4% were male and 50.6% were female
 The median age was 39 years. Children aged 0–14 years made up 21% of the population and people aged 65 years and over made up 18.9% of the population.
 62.9% of people were born in Australia. The most common countries of birth were Lebanon 4.5%, India 2.9%, Malta 2.5%, China 1.5% and Philippines 1.3%.
 The most common ancestries were Australian 21%, English 16.4%, Lebanese 15.5%, Maltese 6.2% and Italian 6.1%.
 55.4% of people only spoke English at home. Other languages spoken at home included Arabic 13%, Maltese 2.3%, Greek 2.1%, Turkish 1.7% and Croatian 1.6%.
 The most common responses for religion were Catholic 44.7%, No Religion 13%, Islam 8.3%, Anglican 7.4%, and Eastern Orthodox 5.8%.

Politics

Greystanes is within the local government area of Cumberland Council, with Viv May appointed as Administrator until elections in September 2017. At the state level, Hugh McDermott (Labor) is the State MP for Prospect and Julia Finn (Labor) is the State MP for Granville. At the federal level, Chris Bowen (Labor) is the Federal MP for McMahon.

References

Suburbs of Sydney
Populated places established in 1799
Cumberland Council, New South Wales